Edmund William Gilbert (1900–1973) was a British social geographer. He was Professor of Geography at the University of Oxford, from 1953 to 1967.
and Fellow of Hertford College, Oxford. He defined geography in terms of the recognition of the characters of regions
 
In the 1920s, while at Reading University, he studied the American West. He was much influenced by Halford Mackinder, to the point of being thought an uncritical admirer.

During World War II he worked on the Naval Intelligence Handbooks, producing, with Robert Beckinsale and S. da Sá, the Spain and Portugal volumes.

Works
The Exploration of Western America, 1800-1850: An Historical Geography (1933)
Brighton Old Ocean's Bauble (1953)
The University Town in England and West Germany (1961)
British Pioneers in Geography (1972)

References
Obituary: Edmund William Gilbert, The Geographical Journal, Vol. 140, No. 1 (Feb., 1974), pp. 176–177

Notes

1900 births
1973 deaths
British geographers
Fellows of Hertford College, Oxford
Social geographers
20th-century geographers